Yttrium(III) chloride is an inorganic compound of yttrium and chloride. It exists in two forms, the hydrate (YCl3(H2O)6) and an anhydrous form (YCl3).  Both are colourless solids that are highly soluble in water and deliquescent.

Structure
Solid YCl3 adopts a cubic structure with close-packed chloride ions and yttrium ions filling one third of the octahedral holes and the resulting YCl6 octahedra sharing three edges with adjacent octahedra, giving it a layered structure. This structure is shared by a range of compounds, notably AlCl3.

Preparation and reactions
YCl3 is often prepared by the "ammonium chloride route," starting from either Y2O3 or hydrated chloride or oxychloride. or YCl3·6H2O. These methods produce (NH4)2[YCl5]:

10 NH4Cl  +  Y2O3  →  2 (NH4)2[YCl5]  +  6 NH3 + 3 H2O

YCl3·6H2O + 2 NH4Cl → (NH4)2[YCl5] + 6 H2O

The pentachloride decomposes thermally according to the following equation:
 (NH4)2[YCl5]   →   2 NH4Cl  +  YCl3
The thermolysis reaction proceeds via the intermediacy of (NH4)[Y2Cl7].

Treating Y2O3 with aqueous HCl produces the hydrated chloride (YCl3·6H2O). When heated, this salt yields yttrium oxychloride rather than reverting to the anhydrous form.

References

Yttrium compounds
Chlorides
Metal halides
Deliquescent substances